The Aztec Ruins Visitor Center, also known as the Aztec Ruins Administration Building/Museum, by the main entrance to the Aztec Ruins National Monument, on the outskirts of Aztec, New Mexico, was built in 1919.  It is located approximately 0.75 miles north of U.S. Route 550, by the Animas River.  It was listed on the National Register of Historic Places in 1996.

It was a field station of the American Natural History Museum.  Archeologist Earl Morris lived and worked here.

References

Museums in San Juan County, New Mexico
National Register of Historic Places in San Juan County, New Mexico
Mission Revival architecture in New Mexico
Buildings and structures completed in 1919
Archaeological museums in New Mexico
National Park Service visitor centers
Pueblo Revival architecture in New Mexico